Ralph Jaime Camargo (February 27, 1912 – January 15, 1992) was an American actor, best known for his work in theater. He was also well known for being "the voice of Dynamic," narrating many short films in the 1950s and 1960s for the Firestone Tire and Rubber Company.

Camargo was an actor in the soap opera Guiding Light in the era of old-time radio.

His daughters are actresses Victoria Wyndham and Felice Camargo. His grandson is film and television actor Christian Camargo.

References

External links

1912 births
1992 deaths
American male film actors
American male stage actors
American male television actors
Male actors from Greenwich, Connecticut
20th-century American male actors
American male actors of Mexican descent
Male actors from California
20th-century American singers